Vasek Pospisil and Bobby Reynolds were the defending champions but Reynolds decided not to participate.
Pospisil played alongside Rajeev Ram.
James Cerretani and Adil Shamasdin won the final 7–6(7–5), 6–1 against Tomasz Bednarek and Olivier Charroin.

Seeds

Draw

Draw

References
 Main Draw

Jalisco Open - Doubles
2012 Doubles